William Stimpson (February 14, 1832 – May 26, 1872) was a noted American scientist.  He was interested particularly in marine biology.  Stimpson became an important early contributor to the work of the Smithsonian Institution and later, director of the Chicago Academy of Sciences.

Biography
Stimpson was born in Boston, Massachusetts to Herbert Hathorne Stimpson and Mary Ann Devereau Brewer. The Stimpsons were of the colonial stock of Massachusetts, the earliest known member of the family being James Stimpson, who was married in 1661, in Milton. His mother died at an early age. William Stimpson's father was an ingenious inventor, and a leading merchant of Boston in the mid decades of the nineteenth century, trading as "H. & F. Stimpson, stoves and furnaces, corner of Congress and Water Streets. It was he who invented the "Stimpson range", the first sheet-iron cooking stove, famous in its day throughout New England. He also made improvements in rifles, and suggested the placing of the flange on the inside of railway car wheels instead of on the outside, as had been the custom. His son was to inherit his energy, love of social life, enthusiasm, and brilliant wit.

Stimpson's father moved from Roxbury and built a house in the village of Cambridge. When fourteen years of age he read with delight Edwin Swett's work on geology, and soon after this a copy of Augustus Addison Gould's Report on the Invertebrata of Massachusetts filled him with exultant enthusiasm.

He graduated from the Cambridge high school in 1848, winning the gold medal, the highest prize of the school. In September 1848 he entered the Cambridge Latin School, absorbing the mastery he displayed in the use of Latin in the description of marine animals in his Prodromus of 1857–60.

He studied under the great naturalist Louis Agassiz. He focused most of his studies on marine biology, particularly invertebrates. Starting when he was 21 years old, from 1853 to 1856, he collected various specimens in the Pacific Northwest. He then settled in Washington, D.C., where he founded the Megatherium Club at the Smithsonian Institution. At the Smithsonian, he was named the director of the department of invertebrates. When fellow club member Robert Kennicott left his post as director of the Academy of Science in Chicago, Stimpson went to that city to take his place. There he gathered one of the most extensive natural history collections in the United States.  The academy was destroyed in the Great Chicago Fire of 1871 (later rebuilt), and almost all of Stimpson's works and specimens were lost. He died the following year of tuberculosis in Ilchester, Maryland).

Species named for him

 Rare Hawaiian Goby Fish Sicydium stimpsoni Gill, 1860
 Eel Bathycongrus stimpsoni Fowler, 1934
 Sun Starfish Solaster stimpsoni
 Stimpson coastal shrimp Heptacarpus stimpsoni
 Fossil - small aquatic arthropod Acanthotelson stimpsoni Meek & Worthen
 Striped sunstar Solaster stimpsoni
 Clam Mercenaria stimpsoni
 Yellow Cone Conus stimpsoni Dall, 1902
 Eyespot Rock Shrimp Sicyonia stimpsoni Bouvier, 1905
 Nudibranch mollusc Coryphella stimpsoni (Verrill 1879)
 Gastropod Pteropurpura stimpsoni (A. Adams, 1863)
 Gastropod Turritellopsis stimpsoni (Dall, 1919)
 genus of flowering plants (family Primulaceae), Stimpsonia (C.Wright ex A.Gray, 1859 )

Bibliography
 Stimpson W. (1851). Shells of New England. A revision of the synonymy of the testaceous mollusks of New England. Phillips, Samson & Co., Boston. vi + 58 pp., 2 plates.
 Stimpson W. (1864). "On the structural characters of so-called melanians of North America". The American Journal of Science and Arts (2)38: 41-53.
 Stimpson W. (1865). "On certain genera and families of zoophagous gastropods". American Journal of Conchology 1(1): 55-64, plates 8-9.
 Stimpson W. (1865). "Diagnoses of newly discovered genera of gasteropods, belonging to the sub-fam. Hydrobiinae, of the family Rissoidae". American Journal of Conchology 1: 52-54.
 Stimpson W. (1865). "Researches upon the Hydrobiinae and allied forms chiefly made upon materials in the museum of the Smithsonian Institution". Smithsonian Miscellaneous Collections 7(201): 1-59.

See also
 European and American voyages of scientific exploration
:Category:Taxa named by William Stimpson

References
This article incorporates public domain text from the reference

External links
 Stimpson biography from the Smithsonian Institution
 Biography and reproductions of some of Stimpson's illustrations
William Stimpson Papers, 1852-1861 from the Smithsonian Institution Archives
https://www.cornellpress.cornell.edu/book/9780875807843/william-stimpson-and-the-golden-age-of-american-natural-history/#bookTabs=1

American carcinologists
Conchologists
American malacologists
1832 births
1872 deaths
Scientists from Massachusetts
People from Boston
19th-century deaths from tuberculosis
19th-century American zoologists
Cambridge Rindge and Latin School alumni
Tuberculosis deaths in Maryland